Auguste Auspitz-Kolár (19 March 1844 – 26 December 1878 was a Bohemian-born Austrian pianist and composer.

The daughter of Josef Jiří Kolár, actor, director and translator, and Anna Manetinská Kolárová, a singer, she was born Auguste Kolár in Prague and studied piano with Bedřich Smetana and then Josef Proksch in Prague and with Wilhelmine Clauss-Szarvady in Paris. In 1865, she travelled to Vienna where she performed in concerts held by the Hellmesberger Quartet. She also performed in concert with Clara Schumann. Auspitz-Kolár performed in London during the summers of 1868 and 1870.

In 1868, she married physician Heinrich Auspitz. She continued performing until her son Hans was born in 1875.

Auspitz-Kolar died in Vienna.

External resources 
Auguste Auspitz-Kolár papers, ca. 1858-1902 (her personal papers) in the Music & Recorded Sound Division of The New York Public Library for the Performing Arts

References 

1844 births
1878 deaths
Musicians from Prague
People from the Kingdom of Bohemia
Austrian classical pianists
Women classical pianists
Austrian women classical composers
19th-century Czech musicians
19th-century Austrian musicians
19th-century Austrian male musicians
19th-century women pianists